Ramón Luis "Mon" Rodríguez Soto (5 November 1928 – 13 November 2006), also known as Mon Rodríguez, was a Costa Rican  footballer who played professionally in the Mexican Primera División.

He also represented Costa Rica at international level.

Club career
Born in Tibás, San José, Rodríguez played as a forward. He began his career with local side Orión. He made his Costa Rican Primera División debut with Orión in 1949, scoring 13 goals in his first season.

Rodríguez began playing professional football with Mexican Primera División side Irapuato in 1954. Four seasons later, he moved to El Salvador to play for Dragón and Águila. Next, Rodríguez began a career as a player-manager, first with Luis Ángel Firpo, Zelaya and Progreso of Honduras. In 1965, he returned to Costa Rica where he retired from playing and managed local side Nicoya.

International career
Rodríguez scored two goals in three appearances for the Costa Rica national football team, helping the side win the 1953 CCCF Championship.

Personal life
Rodríguez worked for many years at the Banco Popular, retiring in 1990. He was married and had two children. He died in November 2006.

References

1928 births
2006 deaths
People from San José Province
Association football forwards
Costa Rican footballers
Costa Rica international footballers
Liga MX players
Irapuato F.C. footballers
C.D. Águila footballers
C.D. Luis Ángel Firpo footballers
Costa Rican expatriate footballers
Expatriate footballers in Mexico
Expatriate footballers in El Salvador
Expatriate footballers in Honduras
Costa Rican football managers
C.D. Luis Ángel Firpo managers
Expatriate football managers in El Salvador